This is a list of rivers of Grenada. Rivers in Grenada flow towards the Caribbean Sea, which surrounds the islands of Grenada.  There are no rivers on the islands of Carriacou and Petite Martinique.

See also
Geography of Grenada
Grenadines
List of cities in Grenada
List of islands of Grenada
List of volcanoes in Grenada
List of rivers of the Americas by coastline
Parishes of Grenada

References

 
Grenada
Rivers of Grenada
Grenada